Kensworth Chalk Quarry is a  geological Site of Special Scientific Interest in Kensworth in Bedfordshire. It was notified under Section 28 of the Wildlife and Countryside Act 1981, and the local planning authority is Central Bedfordshire.

The site is a large working quarry which exposes fossiliferous chalk rocks of the late Cretaceous, with many rare fossils including ammonites. It is described by Natural England as "an unrivalled locality for stratigraphic  studies in the Upper Cretaceous". It is a Geological Conservation Review site, and one succession of layers is the stratotype for the "Kensworth Nodular Chalk Member".

There is no public access.

References

Sites of Special Scientific Interest in Bedfordshire
Geological Conservation Review sites
Chalk pits